The 1993–94 Drexel Dragons men's basketball team represented Drexel University  during the 1993–94 NCAA Division I men's basketball season. The Dragons, led by 3rd year head coach Bill Herrion, played their home games at the Physical Education and Athletic Center and were members of the North Atlantic Conference (NAC).

The team finished the season 25–5, and finished in 1st place in the NAC in the regular season.

Roster

Schedule

|-
!colspan=9 style="background:#F8B800; color:#002663;"| Regular season
|-

|-
!colspan=9 style="background:#F5CF47; color:#002663;"| NAC tournament

|-
!colspan=9 style="background:#F8B800; color:#002663;"| 1994 NCAA Division I men's basketball tournament
|-

Rankings

Awards
 Brian Holden
NAC All-Conference First Team
NAC All-Tournament Team

Malik Rose
NAC Tournament Most Valuable Player
NAC All-Conference First Team
NAC Player of the Week

References

Drexel Dragons men's basketball seasons
Drexel
Drexel
1993 in sports in Pennsylvania
1994 in sports in Pennsylvania